Chetpet is a major town and a municipality in Tiruvannamalai district in the state of Tamil Nadu, India. Chetpet's major economical activity is processing paddy and the town is home to one of the largest organised paddy exchange market of the state. Chetpet is one of the very few places of German colonisation in Indian history.

History
From 2015 Chetpet became a Taluk under Tiruvannamalai District, Tamil Nadu.

Demographics
Chetpet has a population of 94,387, consisting of 47,272 males and 47,115 females, with 10.83% of the population being under the age of 6 years. The town has a literacy rate of about 69%, which is 10% higher than the national average; male literacy is 77% and female literacy is 61%.

Chetpet is a Selection Grade Town Panchayat, a small town under 20,000 or 25,000 inhabitants, in the district of Tiruvannamalai in the state of Tamil Nadu, India.

Economy
More than 80% of its inhabitants are farmers, and the primary source of income is agriculture.

The town's main crops are groundnut, paddy and sugarcane. Chetput is a fast developing town, ranking with panchayats of Pazhampet and Kannanur. Animal husbandry provides subsidiary income to farmers in the region. A veterinary dispensary established in 1963 provides services to the farmers.

The STD code for Chetpet is 04181. Its pincode number is 606801.

Education
Schools:

 Dhivya Matriculation Higher Secondary School
 Government Higher Secondary School
 Panchayat Union Primary School
 St. Dominic Savio Higher Secondary School
 St. Anne Higher Secondary School
 Dhivya High School
 Danie Matriculation High School
 Smart Kids Play School
 Masabiel English School

Colleges:
 Dhivya College of Education
 Dhivya Arts and Science College
 Dhivya Polytechnic College
 Dhivya Teacher Training Institute
 Dr Maria Aschhoff School of Nursing

Adjacent communities 
Its neighboring towns are Vandavasi (east), Polur (west), Gingee (south), Tiruvannamalai (southwest) and Arani (north).

Religion and Culture 
In the outskirts of Chettupattu town there is a Christian chapel on the hill called Madha hill chapel. This hill shrine has a grotto which is an exact replica of the Grotto found in the town of Lourdes, France. This hill shrine contains lots of attractions such as stations on the cross, Adoration chapel, A small park near the sacred sprint and a huge prayer hall. Girivalam is a pious pilgrimage undertaken by the devotees around the holy hill with chants on every full moon day.

See also 

 Cheyyar

References

Cities and towns in Tiruvannamalai district